Let's Just Play Go Healthy Challenge is an American reality television series, which aired on Nickelodeon. Each season followed kids over a six-month period in the quest to make their lives healthier.

Support
The Let's Just Play Go Healthy Challenge is mostly supported by the network and The Alliance for a Healthier Generation, an initiative between the Clinton Foundation and the American Heart Association.

Additionally, Nickelodeon and The Alliance for a Healthier Generations have formed the Go Healthy Challenge Champions Network, a group of organizations that are also supporting the show. They include the American Heart Association, American Diabetes Association, the National Association of Physical and Sports Education, National Recreation and Park Association, and the National Rural Health Association. They give support by helping to increase participation and awareness of the campaign.

Worldwide Day of Play

The Worldwide Day of Play was a yearly event for kids and parents to go out and go play. When the six-month period ended in September, Nickelodeon aired the finale during the last Saturday of September, and title those days as, "Worldwide Day of Play". Nickelodeon went off the air for 3 hours from 12 Noon to 3PM ET/PT on all Nick channels.

References

External links
 

2006 American television series debuts
2007 American television series endings
2000s American children's television series
2000s Nickelodeon original programming
American children's education television series
American children's reality television series
Health education television series
Clinton Foundation